Zubutli-Miatli is a rural locality (a selo) and the administrative centre of Zubutli-Miatlinsky Selsoviet, Kizilyurtovsky District, Republic of Dagestan, Russia. The population was 4,529 as of 2010. There are 65 streets.

Geography 
Zubutli-Miatli is located 10 km west of Kizilyurt (the district's administrative centre) by road, on the Sulak River. Novy Sulak and Novoye Gadari are the nearest rural localities.

Nationalities 
Avars live there.

References 

Rural localities in Kizilyurtovsky District